Piricse is a village in Szabolcs-Szatmár-Bereg county, in the Northern Great Plain region of eastern Hungary.

Geography
It covers an area of

Population
Of the town's population of 1,835 people (2001) 94.5% identified themselves as Hungarian and 5.5% as Gypsy.

Notable people
 Michael Fedics (1851–1938), the great storytellers.
 Rabbi Yaakov Yehuda Aryeh Leib Frenkel(died 1940) - the Town Rabbi
 Irene Wild recognized jazz singer. The Budapest Jazz Garden Club 's founder.

Jewish community
Prior to the Holocaust a small Jewish community existed in Piricse.
 The Jewish population in 1880 was 171 and declined to 73 by 1930.

Piricse